Minmini (born P. J. Rosily) is a South Indian film playback singer. She is best remembered for the song "Chinna Chinna Aasai" from Roja, the debut work of film composer A. R. Rahman, which was dubbed in Hindi as "Choti Si Asha". Most of her songs are in Tamil, most of them composed by Ilaiyaraaja and A. R. Rahman. Her Malayalam songs include "Souparnikamritha" from Kizhakkunarum Pakshi, "Oonjal Urangi", and "Neelaraavi" from Kudumbasametham. She has lent her voice to songs from films including Enga Thambi (1993), Karuththamma (1994), and Thevar Magan (1992). She made a comeback in 2015 with the song "Kanmaniye" from Mili.

Career 
Minmini had her film debut with Swagatham (1988), directed by Venu Nagavalli. She sang three songs in it, composed by Rajamani. She was introduced to Tamil film industry by Ilayaraja through Tamil Movie - Meera (1991). Ilayaraja christened her Minmini, making her name more appealing to the Tamilians. Minmini's first Telugu movie is "Aathmabandham" with music by Maragathamani.

Her big break came in 1992 when she sang "Chinna Chinna Aasai" for the film Roja.

Minmini has sung a few Kannada film  songs in 1995 for the movies Putnanja and Betegara. Rangero holi a duet song with Mano from the movie Putnanja for Hamsalekha. In the same film she rendered humming in the song Putamalli puttamalli with Mano and Shyamala G. Bhave. She went on to work with Sadhu Kokila for the movie Betegara where she sang the song Mididiralu saviganasugalu with Mano.

Gopi Sundar bought her  back to the industry with the song "Kanmaniye" for the film Mili in 2015.

References

External links

 

Living people
Indian women playback singers
Tamil playback singers
Tamil Nadu State Film Awards winners
Singers from Kochi
Malayalam playback singers
Singers from Kerala
Film musicians from Kerala
Women musicians from Kerala
20th-century Indian singers
21st-century Indian singers
21st-century Indian women singers
People from Aluva
20th-century Indian women singers
Year of birth missing (living people)